Gagliano del Capo is an Italian comune situated in the province of Lecce, the southernmost one of Apulia.

In its territory is located Ciolo, a rocky cove that is part of the Regional Natural Coastal Park of "Costa Otranto-Santa Maria di Leuca e Bosco di Tricase".

References

Cities and towns in Apulia
Localities of Salento
Coastal towns in Apulia